Erica Dasher (born October 27, 1986) is an American actress. She is best known for her role as Jane Quimby, the title character in the ABC Family series Jane by Design and as Alana Maynor, the lead character in the go90 series, Guidance.

Life and education
Dasher was born in Houston, Texas. She attended The Village School on the west side of Houston, but moved on to Westside High School, where she graduated in 2004. She attended the University of Southern California, studying theater with the intention to become a film director and producer.

Career
Dasher co-starred as Madison in The WB Television Network web series The Lake. She along with Sami Kriegstein founded the production company Not Just Dead Bodies in 2007. The company produced documentary film Double Speak. She was the lead role in the series Jane by Design for one season before it was cancelled.

Dasher also worked as a production assistant on the film Reservations in 2008.

Filmography

References

External links

1986 births
Living people
21st-century American actresses
Actresses from Houston
American film actresses
American television actresses
USC School of Dramatic Arts alumni